Guo Huaying (born 2 January 1965) is a Chinese former swimmer who competed in the 1984 Summer Olympics.

References

1965 births
Living people
Chinese female backstroke swimmers
Olympic swimmers of China
Swimmers at the 1984 Summer Olympics
Place of birth missing (living people)
20th-century Chinese women